"It's Tight Like That" is a hokum or dirty blues song, initially recorded by Tampa Red and Georgia Tom on October 24, 1928. The 10" shellac disc single was released by Vocalion Records in December 1928. A successful recording, it eventually sold over seven million copies.

History
Hudson Whittaker and Thomas A. Dorsey met by playing in the backing band accompanying Ma Rainey on her numerous tours. In 1924, Rainey was accompanied by the pianist and bandleader Dorsey and the band he assembled, the Wildcats Jazz Band. They began their tour with an appearance in Chicago in April 1924 and continued, on and off, until 1928. Dorsey left the group in 1926, because of depression from which he suffered for around two years. Having recovered by 1928, he formed a partnership with the blues singer-guitarist Tampa Red. Dorsey adopted the name 'Georgia Tom' and together they co-wrote "It's Tight Like That". 

A Chicago street slang superlative was recounted by Georgia Tom, who helped parlay it into the track. "There used to be a phrase they used around town, you know, folks started saying, "Ah, it's tight like that! Tight like that!" The title is a sly wordplay with the double meaning of being "tight" with someone, coupled with a more salacious physical familiarity. Georgia Tom later had time to regret the use of the double entendre.

Being based in Chicago, Illinois, they had access to the record label Vocalion Records. Vocalion recorded two versions of the song in Chicago, on September 19, and October 8, 1928, but these were unreleased. It was the third recording undertaken on October 24 that year, which became the version that was issued in December. Both Tampa Red and Georgia Tom provided the vocals in a call and response manner. Tampa Red on bottleneck guitar and Georgia Tom playing the piano supplied the musical accompaniment. The B-side of the disc was recorded on October 16, 1928. It was "Grievin' Me Blues", accredited to Georgia Tom alone, even though his vocals and piano playing were accompanied by Tampa Red on guitar. That song was written by Georgia Tom.

"It's Tight Like That" was written in the key of A minor, and had 102 beats per minute. The record was a million seller (an extraordinary achievement at that time), and went on to become a big blues hit, covered by a wide variety of blues, jazz, and country artists over the years. Eventually the record sold more than seven million copies. Billed as either "Tampa Red and Georgia Tom" or "The Famous Hokum Boys", the duo found great success together, eventually collaborating on 60 songs between 1928 and 1932, and coining the term "hokum" to describe their guitar/piano combination with simple, racy lyrics. Several sequels of "It's Tight Like That" were waxed by Tampa Red and Georgia Tom (who, as Thomas A. Dorsey, was later to be hailed as 'the father of black gospel music').

In the liner notes for Jazz Odyssey Vol. 2: The Sounds of Chicago (1923–1940) (Columbia C3 32, 1964) John Steiner stated, "After the appearance of ["It’s Tight Like That"] Georgia Tom and Tampa Red moved up from the house party circuit to headlining Midwest theatres."

Other versions
The track proved popular enough that a slew of other versions were released.  Amongst the more notable of these were those issued by Clara Smith, Luis Russell, McKinney's Cotton Pickers, Lou Gold, Kentucky Grasshoppers, Jimmie Noone, Zack Whyte and His Chocolate Beau Brummels (all in 1929) and the Tune Wranglers (1936). A post-war offering was recorded by Lead Belly in 1948.

Musicians who recorded more contemporary versions of the song include Chris Barber (1955), The Red Onion Jazz Band (1963 and 1976), Asylum Street Spankers (2004), and Mick Kolassa featuring Victor Wainwright (2018).

Re-releases
The track was included in the Document Records compilation album, Tampa Red Vol.1 (May 1928 to 4 December 1953), released in 1991.

Later developments
Tampa Red's partnership with Georgia Tom ended in 1932, but Red remained much in demand as a session musician, working with John Lee "Sonny Boy" Williamson, Memphis Minnie, Big Maceo, and many others.

Dorsey became the music director at the Pilgrim Baptist Church in Chicago, a role he undertook for fifty years.

Critical reception
The blues historian, Roberta Freund Schwartz, suggested that contrary to some commentators, elements of the pre-World War II recorded output of this nature "is worth serious consideration".

In 2014, the Blues Hall of Fame inducted "It's Tight Like That" as a 'Classic of Blues Recording – Single or Album Track'.

References

Sources

External links
Newspaper advertisement from The Houston Chronicle, 1929
Words and music by Hudson Whittaker (Tampa Red) and Thomas A. Dorsey, 1928
Clara Smith's version lyrics

1928 songs
1928 singles
Blues songs
Hokum blues songs
Vocalion Records singles
Dirty blues musicians
Songs written by Thomas A. Dorsey
Tampa Red songs
American songs